tert-Butyldimethylsilyl chloride is an organosilicon compound with the formula (Me3C)Me2SiCl (Me = CH3). It is commonly abbreviated as TBSCl or TBDMSCl.  It is a silane containing two methyl groups, a tert-butyl group, and a reactive chloride.  It is a colorless or white solid that is soluble in many organic solvents but reacts with water and alcohols.  The compound is used to protect alcohols in organic synthesis.  Examples can be found in the Nicolaou taxol total synthesis.

tert-Butyldimethylsilyl chloride reacts with alcohols in the presence of base to give tert-butyldimethylsilyl ethers:
(Me3C)Me2SiCl  +  ROH  →   (Me3C)Me2SiOR  +  HCl
These silyl ethers hydrolyze much more slowly than the trimethylsilyl ethers.

Related reagents
The triflate derivative (Me3C)Me2SiOTf is used similarly but is more difficult to handle.

References

Reagents for organic chemistry
Organosilicon compounds